Engineering New Zealand Te Ao Rangahau (ENZ; previously the New Zealand Institution of Engineers – NZIE and then Institution of Professional Engineers New Zealand – IPENZ) is a not-for-profit professional body that promotes the integrity and interests of members, the profession, and the industry. It seeks to "bring engineering to life" and has more than 20,000 members.

The organisation's strategy is to deliver greater credibility, recognition, influence and connection for members. It promotes engineering as a career and advocates on behalf of members. Engineering New Zealand Te Ao Rangahau sets standards and performs assessments that meet international standards for Chartered Memberships and Registrations for Chartered Professional Engineers. Regional branches run networking events, while technical groups help members stay up-to-date on specific areas of expertise. Members can access continuing professional development and gain experience as volunteers by serving on committees and other bodies.

All members of Engineering New Zealand Te Ao Rangahau commit every year to follow the organisation's Code of Ethical Conduct, and to carrying out continuing professional development.

Organisation structure
Engineering New Zealand Te Ao Rangahau is governed by an elected board, chaired by the president. This board sets strategy and employs the chief executive, who manages operational activity in line with this strategy. The Engineering New Zealand Te Ao Rangahau office is based in Wellington. Members can belong to regional branches and also be part of technical groups that focus on specific expertise. These groups are chaired by volunteers.

History

The first professional engineering body in New Zealand, the Institute of Local Government Engineers of New Zealand, was formed in 1912. The following year the New Zealand Society of Civil Engineers was formed. The two bodies merged in 1914 and were known under the later name until 1937.

The organisation changed its name to The New Zealand Institution of Engineers in 1937. In 1959 the Association of Consulting Engineers New Zealand (ACENZ) was created as a consultancy division, and became a separate entity in 1970. The name Institution of Professional Engineers New Zealand was adopted in 1982.

In 1989, IPENZ became a founding signatory to the Washington Accord.

In 2017, the organisation changed its name to Engineering New Zealand to reflect a significant shift in strategic direction, which focused on delivering greater credibility, recognition, influence and connection to members.

In 2018, the organisation asked kaumātua and respected linguist Sir Tamati Reedy, of Ngāti Porou descent, to consider how Engineering New Zealand could be best represented in te reo Māori. Sir Tamati took a conceptual approach, seeking a name that was simple and memorable. After careful consideration, he decided on Te Ao Rangahau. He used a wide interpretation of engineering and chose “rangahau” because it encompasses the broad meaning around engineering – to design, create, build, investigate, research and solve. Te Ao means “the universe”.

Membership classes
On 1 October 2017, Engineering New Zealand Te Ao Rangahau launched a new Membership Pathway that created a professional home for engineers from all disciplines at all stages of their careers. This includes competence-based classes, which engineers complete a one-off assessment to join.

Competence-based Membership Classes

Other membership classes 
 Student
Student membership gives opportunities to meet engineers and potential employers, connect with other engineering students and gain valuable skills as you prepare for work. Student membership is free. 
 Emerging professional
Emerging Professional Members can access a development programme tailored to recent graduates, which allows them to progress to Member in 3 years. This complements programmes offered by firms who are Engineering New Zealand Professional Development Partners.
 Member (post-nominal MEngNZ)
Members have access to Engineering New Zealand resources and discounted continuing professional development. 
 Fellow (post-nominal FEngNZ), Distinguished Fellow (DistFEngNZ)
A Fellow is an engineer who makes significant contributions to the engineering profession, while a Distinguished Fellow is a Fellow who makes eminent contributions to engineering and advancing the profession. Members apply to become a Fellow, while Distinguished Fellowship is by nomination     only. 
 Honorary Fellow
An Honorary Fellow is an exceptional person committed to supporting and advancing the fields of engineering, technology, or science. Honorary Fellowships are decided on and presented by the Board.

Competence-based registers 
Chartered Professional Engineer (CPEng)[9]

A Chartered Professional Engineer is a professional engineer who is registered through Engineering New Zealand, as the Registration Authority. To apply, engineers complete an assessment showing they can deal with complex engineering problems that require specialist knowledge. CPEng requires engineers to demonstrate competence in a New Zealand context and is reassessed at least every 6 years.

The Chartered Professional Engineers of New Zealand Act (CPEng Act) was enacted on 1 July 2002 and established Engineering New Zealand as the Registration Authority to assess and then register Chartered Professional Engineers (CPEng).

International registers

Joining an international register means an engineer's competence is recognised to an international standard. It allows greater mobility around the world.

Engineering New Zealand maintains the international engineers' registers within New Zealand as part of the International Engineering Alliance (IEA).

Engineering New Zealand offers 3 international registers:
 International Professional Engineer (IntPE)/APEC Engineers Register
 International Engineering Technologist (IntET)
 International Engineering Technician (IntETn) – available in 2018
To be eligible to join an international register, an engineer needs:
 To have demonstrated competence in independent practice (as shown by Chartered Membership of Engineering New Zealand in the relevant category)
 A Washington, Sydney or Dublin Accord-accredited qualification or an equivalent level of academic achievement
 A requisite minimum period in charge of significant engineering work
 A requisite minimum period of engineering experience since graduation
 Sufficient continuing professional development to maintain the currency of knowledge and skills
Mutual recognition
 New Zealand is a signatory to the Washington Accord, the Sydney Accord, and the Dublin Accord, which recognise (respectively) professional engineering (typically four-year), engineering technology (three-year) and engineering technician (two-year) qualifications between signatories. Engineering New Zealand provides accreditation that allows for international mobility between signatory countries.[15]

See also
ACENZ
Engineer
Professional Engineer
Engineering
Fields of engineering
Learned society
Professional association
Professional body
Standards organizations

References

External links
Engineering New Zealand Official Site
Engineering New Zealand JobHunt
Engineering New Zealand Foundation
The Diversity Agenda
The Wonder Project

Engineering societies based in New Zealand